Derrinturn is a village in County Kildare, Ireland. It is part of the parish of Carbury.

The main road through Derrinturn is the R403 regional road.

The village had a population of 1,602 in 2016. From 1961 to 2016, the population increased from 183 to 1,602 (an increase of 875%). In the 20 years between 1996 and 2016, the population tripled (from 544 to 1,602 people).

Derrinturn has one Roman Catholic church and a primary school St. Conleth's (Naomh Connlaodh).

It borders the townlands of Ballyhagan to the west, Ballyshannon to the east, Coonagh to the east, Dreenan to the south, Newbury Demesne to the north, and Rathmore to the south.

See also

List of towns and villages in Ireland

References

Towns and villages in County Kildare